"Hard Times" is the seventh single from British rapper and songwriter Plan B's second studio album, The Defamation of Strickland Banks. On 19 May 2011, it was released as a digital download, featuring newly recorded vocal parts by Elton John and Paloma Faith, recorded as a charity single with all the proceeds benefiting victims of the 2010 Pakistan floods and 2011 Tōhoku earthquake and tsunami.

Track listing
 Digital download
 "Hard Times" (featuring Elton John & Paloma Faith) - 4:05

 Promotional CD single
 "Hard Times" (featuring Elton John & Paloma Faith) - 4:05
 "Hard Times" (Live) (featuring Elton John & Paloma Faith) - 5:44
 "Hard Times" (Edit) - 3:48

Personnel

 Plan B – vocals, producer

Production
 David McEwan – producer
 Eric Appapoulay – additional producer
 Mark "Top" Rankin – engineer, mixing

Additional musicians (single version)
 Elton John – piano, vocals
 Paloma Faith – vocals

Additional musicians (album version)
 Tom Wright-Goss – guitar
 Eric Appapoulay – bass, backing vocals
 Richard Cassell – drums
 Everton Newson – violin
 Louisa Fuller – violin
 Sally Herbert – violin
 Warren Zielinski – violin
 Bruce White – viola
 Sonia Slany – viola
 Ian Burdge – cello

Chart performance

Release history

References

2011 singles
Atlantic Records UK singles
British soul songs
Elton John songs
Paloma Faith songs
Plan B (musician) songs
Songs written by Plan B (musician)
2010 songs